A Game of Two Halves is an Irish panel game with a sporting theme hosted by Trevor Welch and was broadcast on TV3 for one series in 1999. The team leaders were Declan Lynch and Liam Mackey.

References

Irish panel shows
Irish sports television series
Virgin Media Television (Ireland) original programming